Matthew Griswold (June 6, 1833 – May 19, 1919) was an American Congressman from Erie, Pennsylvania.

Biography
Matthew Griswold was the grandson of congressman Roger Griswold and the great-grandson of governor Matthew Griswold. 
He was born in Lyme, Connecticut. He was engaged in teaching and in agricultural pursuits for a number of years, and was elected to various local offices.  He was a member of the Connecticut House of Representatives in 1862 and 1865.  In 1866 he moved to Erie, Pennsylvania, and co-founded what became Griswold Manufacturing, a maker of cast-iron products.  He was elected a trustee of the Erie Academy for four successive terms.

Griswold was elected as a Republican to the 52nd Congress, but was not a candidate for renomination in 1892.  He was again elected to the 54th Congress, but was not a candidate for renomination in 1896.

Notes

Sources

1833 births
1919 deaths
People from Lyme, Connecticut
Griswold family
American people of English descent
Republican Party members of the United States House of Representatives from Pennsylvania
Republican Party members of the Connecticut House of Representatives
Politicians from Erie, Pennsylvania
19th-century American politicians